Rajendra Rathore may refer to:

 Rajendra Singh Rathore, Indian politician
 Rajendra Rathore (chemist) (1961–2018), organic chemist